The following article presents a summary of the 2002 football (soccer) season in Brazil, which was the 101st season of competitive football in the country.

Campeonato Brasileiro Série A

Quarterfinals

Semifinals

Final

Santos declared as the Campeonato Brasileiro champions by aggregate score of 5-2.

Relegation
The four worst placed teams, which are Portuguesa, Palmeiras, Gama and Botafogo, were relegated to the following year's second level.

Campeonato Brasileiro Série B

The Campeonato Brasileiro Série B final was played between Fortaleza and Criciúma.

Criciúma declared as the Campeonato Brasileiro Série B champions by aggregate score of 4-3.

Promotion
The champion and the runner-up, which are Criciúma and Fortaleza, were promoted to the following year's first level.

Relegation
The six worst placed teams, which are Americano, Botafogo-SP, Sampaio Corrêa, Guarany-CE, XV de Piracicaba and Bragantino, were relegated to the following year's third level.

Campeonato Brasileiro Série C

Brasiliense declared as the Campeonato Brasileiro Série C champions.

Promotion
The two best placed teams in the final stage of the competition, which are Brasiliense and Marília, were promoted to the following year's second level.

Copa do Brasil

The Copa do Brasil final was played between Corinthians and Brasiliense.

Corinthians declared as the cup champions by aggregate score of 3-2.

Copa dos Campeões
The Copa dos Campeões final was played between Paysandu and Cruzeiro.

Paysandu declared as the cup champions by aggregate score of 5-5.

Regional and state championship champions

Regional championship champions

State championship champions

(1)The club won a competition named Supercampeonato (Superchampionship), which was an extra tournament that included regional championship teams.
(2)According to the Rio de Janeiro State Football Federation, the 2002 Rio de Janeiro State Championship is sub judice.

Youth competition champions

Other competition champions

Brazilian clubs in international competitions

Brazil national team
The following table lists all the games played by the Brazil national football team in official competitions and friendly matches during 2002.

Women's football

Brazil women's national football team
The Brazil women's national football team did not play any matches in 2002.

References

 Brazilian competitions at RSSSF
 2002 Brazil national team matches at RSSSF
 2000-2003 Brazil women's national team matches at RSSSF

 
Seasons in Brazilian football
Brazil